Bill Carow (born June 26, 1958) is an American biathlete. He competed at the 1984 Winter Olympics and the 1988 Winter Olympics.

References

External links
 

1958 births
Living people
American male biathletes
Olympic biathletes of the United States
Biathletes at the 1984 Winter Olympics
Biathletes at the 1988 Winter Olympics
People from Brattleboro, Vermont